The Unggumi, also written Ongkomi, are an Aboriginal Australian people of the Kimberley region of Western Australian.

Country
They occupied the area south of the Isdell River gorge, as far as the Lennard River and Chestnut Creek. Their western frontier was around the headwaters of the Robinson River. To the south east, they hunted as far as the Richenda River.

History
Tindale speculated on the basis of the nuances in their terminology for the cardinal points, that at one time the Unggumi had been a coastal people who had been driven by tribal pressures to seek sanctuary on the hard, inaccessible terrain of the upland ranges. The Ngarinjin lay northeast, the Wurla directly east, the Bunuba south-east the Nyigina directly south, while the Warrwa, and the Umiida lay on their western flank, between them and the sea.

Alternative names
 Ong Komi.
 Wongkomi.
 Ongaranjan.
 Ungumi, Ungami.
 Ngarangari. – Ngarinjin exonym meaning 'top-dwelling', referring to their living on the top of the range.
 Wunggumic, Ngarangari, Ong, Komi, Wongkami, Wongkomiy. (language names)

Notes

Citations

Sources

Aboriginal peoples of Western Australia
Kimberley (Western Australia)